The 1903 Camborne by-election was a by-election held on 8 April 1903 for the British House of Commons constituency of Camborne in Cornwall.

The by-election was triggered by the death of the serving Liberal Party Member of Parliament (MP), William Sproston Caine.  The Liberal victor, Wilfrid Lawson had previously been MP for Cockermouth and Carlisle and at 74 was the second oldest victor at a by-election.

The Liberal Association invited Lawson to stand for the by-election. They made the offer under peculiarly acceptable conditions, for should he secure the seat, he would be at liberty, when the next election occurred, to return, should he wish, to his old constituency at Cockermouth. Almost immediately after the Cornish electorate returned Lawson with a huge majority, the Cockermouth Liberal Associated selected him to stand as their candidate at the next election. In parliament he continued to prosecute his anti-imperialist, Free Trade and temperance views while at home he began to campaign for the oncoming election. In January 1906 he returned with to Carlisle a majority of almost 600.

The Liberal Unionist candidate, Arthur Strauss, had been the Conservative MP for Camborne from 1895 to 1900, having previously stood in 1892 United Kingdom general election.  He would later join the Labour Party.

Votes

References 

By-elections to the Parliament of the United Kingdom in Cornish constituencies
1903 elections in the United Kingdom
1903 in England
April 1903 events
Camborne
1900s in Cornwall